Limestone Creek is a census-designated place (CDP) in Palm Beach County, Florida, United States. The population was 1,316 at the 2020 census.

Geography
Limestone Creek is located at  (26.943809, -80.140330).

According to the United States Census Bureau, the CDP has a total area of 1.2 km2 (0.4 mi2), all land.

Demographics

As of the census of 2000, there were 569 people, 157 households, and 124 families living in the CDP.  The population density was 488.2/km2 (1,256.7/mi2).  There were 166 housing units at an average density of 142.4/km2 (366.6/mi2).  The racial makeup of the CDP was 17.22% White (10.7% were Non-Hispanic White,) 77.33% African American, 0.18% Native American, 1.05% Asian, 1.76% from other races, and 2.46% from two or more races. Hispanic or Latino of any race were 9.49% of the population.

There were 157 households, out of which 45.2% had children under the age of 18 living with them, 42.0% were married couples living together, 31.2% had a female householder with no husband present, and 20.4% were non-families. 15.9% of all households were made up of individuals, and 3.8% had someone living alone who was 65 years of age or older.  The average household size was 3.62 and the average family size was 4.02.

In the CDP, the population was spread out, with 38.8% under the age of 18, 7.7% from 18 to 24, 29.9% from 25 to 44, 16.3% from 45 to 64, and 7.2% who were 65 years of age or older.  The median age was 28 years. For every 100 females, there were 96.2 males.  For every 100 females age 18 and over, there were 81.3 males.

The median income for a household in the CDP was $31,125, and the median income for a family was $30,875. Males had a median income of $33,239 versus $22,750 for females. The per capita income for the CDP was $12,195.  About 7.0% of families and 8.5% of the population were below the poverty line, including 6.1% of those under age 18 and 34.5% of those age 65 or over.

As of 2000, 100% of the population spoke English as their first language.

Roads
Limestone Creek is located near Indiantown Road and Interstate 95.

References

Census-designated places in Palm Beach County, Florida
Census-designated places in Florida